John Immel House was an historic farm house located in Jackson Township, Lebanon County, Pennsylvania. It was built in 1814, in the Pennsylvania German Traditional architecture style, from locally quarried limestone and featured master masonry work. It was strategically located near the Union Canal towpath to take advantage of quick access to the fastest transportation system in the southeastern Pennsylvania area during the early nineteenth century.

Immel family

The Immel family are descendants of original German Palatine immigrants. The Immel family was influential in the southeastern Pennsylvania area in the early nineteenth-century as they were involved in religious activities, civic functions and business transactions.

Pennsylvania German Traditional Architecture

The John Immel House was a -story, "L"-shaped farm house, four bays wide and four bays deep. It had a 32 feet by 32 feet main section, and included an 18 feet by 18 feet rear extension. The front facade featured a classically designed main entranceway with a full pediment and an unusual fan-shaped top transom. The structure included a full basement under both sections, and had a one-room attic above the main section. The John Immel House's most noticeable feature was its excellent early nineteenth-century master masonry workmanship. Examples of this workmanship included non-uniformly shaped limestone building blocks intricately fitted together and large limestone quoins.

The John Immel House was a near picture-perfect example of Pennsylvania German Traditional architecture because it contained most of the identifiable features of the style including a steep pitched main gable roof, thick stone outer wall construction, four over four front bay façade design, dual gable end brick chimneys, and stood  stories high

National Register of Historic Places

The John Immel House was added onto the National Register of Historic Places on April 17, 1980, for its architectural significance as an early nineteenth-century Pennsylvania German Traditional farmhouse.  It was delisted in 2022.

Demolition

The John Immel House caught on fire around 1990, and suffered damage that was beyond economic repair. It was demolished soon afterwards. A contributing wooden shed that was located next to it was also demolished around the same time.

References

Houses on the National Register of Historic Places in Pennsylvania
Demolished buildings and structures in Pennsylvania
Houses completed in 1814
Houses in Lebanon County, Pennsylvania
National Register of Historic Places in Lebanon County, Pennsylvania
Former National Register of Historic Places in Pennsylvania